Franca Fiacconi (born 4 October 1965 in Rome) is a marathon runner from Italy.

Biography
Fiacconi won the 1998 New York City Marathon, after finishing second in 1996 and third in 1997. She also won the 2001 Enschede Marathon. She placed fourth in the women's marathon at the 1998 European Championships and won the silver medal at the 1993 Summer Universiade.

Fiacconi won the Turin Marathon in 1996 and 1998, also taking the Italian national title in the latter edition.

Achievements
All results regarding marathon, unless stated otherwise

Personal bests
10,000 metres - 36:02.5 - Roma - 10/04/1993
Half marathon - 1:12:37 - Uster - 27/09/1998
30 kilometres - 1:44:08 - Osaka - 28/01/2001
Marathon - 2:25:17 - New York City - 01/11/1998

See also
 Italian all-time lists - Marathon

References

External links
 

1965 births
Living people
Italian female long-distance runners
Italian female marathon runners
Athletes from Rome
New York City Marathon female winners
European Athletics Championships medalists
Universiade medalists in athletics (track and field)
Universiade silver medalists for Italy
Medalists at the 1993 Summer Universiade
20th-century Italian women
21st-century Italian women